Vigor Lamezia is an Italian association football club, based in Lamezia Terme, Calabria. Vigor Lamezia currently plays in Promozione, 6th level of the Italian football league system.

History 
The club was founded in 1919 and refounded in 1995 and 2017.

Vigor Lamezia reached the most important point of its history with the 9th place in the Serie C 1947–48.

In the 2013–14 season it was promoted to Lega Pro for the second time in its history. After ending 2014/15 Lega Pro at 11th place, Vigor Lamezia was placed last and relegated as punishment for match fixing.

After going bankrupt in 2017, two new different teams were created and joined Italian Lower Divisions: ASD Vigor Lamezia Calcio 1919 (that joined the 7th division) and ASD Vigor 1919 (that joined 9th division).

In June 2020 the teams were merged and currently Vigor Lamezia plays in Eccellenza, 5th level of Italian football.

Colors and Badge 
The team's colors are green and white.

Stadium 
It plays at the Stadio Guido D'Ippolito which has a capacity of 5,842.

References

External links 
Official site

Association football clubs established in 1919
Lamezia Terme
Football clubs in Calabria
Serie C clubs
1919 establishments in Italy